Evandro Soldati (born April 17, 1985) is a Brazilian model. According to Forbes, he was the 7th most successful male model in the world in 2008.

Biography
Soldati was born in Ubá, Minas Gerais. He is of Italian descent. Evandro appears in the music video for Lady Gaga's single "Alejandro".

Career 

He started modelling in 2002 when his mother signed him up for a Ford contest in his native Brazil. He has since shot onto the current fashion scene by starring in recent campaigns for Louis Vuitton and Valentino. He has also done campaigns for Abercrombie & Fitch, Guess and Dolce & Gabbana.
He is also the main male model in the Giorgio Armani ads during 2007 and the 2008 Armani Jeans ad.

In an interview with Globo Magazine, Evandro was quoted as saying that he enjoyed modeling because of its perks the job brought him. He said, "You get to travel the world, and it is always free. You get to know different places, and I have learned English and a bit of Italian as well." In his spare time, Evandro enjoys playing the Brazilian martial art capoeira, and soccer.

After skipping several fashion weeks in Europe, he returned there for the Dolce & Gabbana fashion show during the Ready-to-wear Autumn/Fall 2010 fashion week.

Personal life
He was married to Brazilian actress and model Yasmin Brunet from 2017 to 2020.

References

External links 

1985 births
Living people
People from Ubá
Brazilian people of Italian descent
Brazilian male models